(born 21 December 1973) is a Japanese former ski jumper.

Career
Miyahira won four medals at the FIS Nordic World Ski Championships with three silver (individual and team large hills in 1999, team large hill in 2003) and one bronze (individual normal hill in 1999).

He competed at the 2002 Winter Olympics in Salt Lake City, finishing 5th in the team large hill and 24th in the individual large hill. He also competed at the Ski Flying World Championships, with best finishes of 5th in the team competition in 2004 and 10th in the individual competition in 2000.

He is one of so far only seven jumpers in history who managed to achieve perfect marks from all five judges (20 points maximum) for his second jump at the World Cup competition in Willingen in 2003.

World Cup

Standings

Wins

External links

Japanese male ski jumpers
1973 births
Ski jumpers at the 2002 Winter Olympics
Olympic ski jumpers of Japan
Living people
FIS Nordic World Ski Championships medalists in ski jumping